Generał Tadeusz Komorowski (1 June 1895 – 24 August 1966), better known by the name Bór-Komorowski (after one of his wartime code-names: Bór – "The Forest") was a Polish military leader. He was appointed commander in chief a day before the capitulation of the Warsaw Uprising and following World War II, 32nd Prime Minister of Poland, 3rd Polish government-in-exile in London.

Life
Komorowski was born in Khorobriv, in the Kingdom of Galicia and Lodomeria (the Austrian partition of Poland). In the First World War he served as an officer in the Austro-Hungarian Army, and after the war became an officer in the Polish Army, rising to command the Grudziądz Cavalry School. He was a member of the Polish equestrian team that went to the 1924 Summer Olympics.

After taking part in the fighting against the German invasion of Poland at the beginning of World War II in 1939, Komorowski, with the code-name Bór, helped organise the Polish underground in the Kraków area. In July 1941 he became deputy commander of the Home Army (Armia Krajowa or "AK"), and in March 1943 gained appointment as its commander, with the rank of Brigadier-General. He was sympathetic to the right-wing, antisemitic National Party. As commander of the Home Army,  Komorowski reversed the pro-Jewish policies of his predecessor, Stefan Rowecki. Komorowski opposed aid to Jews seeking to mount ghetto uprisings and favoured the exclusion of Jews from the organisation. American historian Joshua D. Zimmerman accuses Komorowski of characterising Jewish partisans as "communist, pro-Soviet elements" and having "chilling indifference" to the ongoing Holocaust.

The Uprising

In mid 1944, as Soviet forces advanced into central Poland, the Polish government-in-exile in London instructed Bór-Komorowski to prepare for an armed uprising in Warsaw. The government-in-exile wished to return to a capital city liberated by Poles, not seized by the Soviets, and prevent the Communist take-over of Poland which Stalin had planned. The Warsaw uprising began on Komorowski's order on 1 August 1944 and the insurgents of the AK seized control of most of central Warsaw.

On 29 September 1944, Bór-Komorowski was promoted to General Inspector of the Armed Forces (Polish Commander-in-Chief). On 4 October, after two months of fierce fighting, Bór-Komorowski surrendered to SS-Obergruppenführer Erich von dem Bach-Zelewski after Nazi Germany agreed to treat the Home Army fighters as prisoners-of-war. General Bór-Komorowski went into internment in Germany (at Oflag IV-C). Despite repeated demands, he refused to order the remaining Home Army units in Occupied Poland to surrender.

Life in exile
After the war Bór-Komorowski moved to London, where he played an active role in Polish émigré circles. From 1947 to 1949 he served as Prime Minister of the Polish government-in-exile, which no longer had diplomatic recognition from most Western European countries. He wrote the story of his experiences in The Secret Army (1950). After the war he was an upholsterer.

Death
He died in London aged 71. After his death in London on 24 August 1966, he was buried in Gunnersbury Cemetery (also known as (New) Kensington Cemetery).

On 30 July 1994, Gen. Tadeusz Bór-Komorowski's ashes were buried in Powązki Military Cemetery in Warsaw.

Honours and awards
 Order of the White Eagle (posthumously, 1995)
 Commander's Cross of the Order of Virtuti Militari (previously awarded the Knight's Cross, the Gold Cross and the Silver Cross)
 Grand Cross of the Order of Polonia Restituta (previously awarded the Officer's Cross)
 Cross of Valour – three times
 Gold Cross of Merit with Swords
 Gold Cross of Merit
 Silver Cross of Merit
 Honorary citizen of Glowno (posthumously, 2004)

See also
 Operation Tempest
 Warsaw Uprising

Notes

References

External links 
 

1895 births
1966 deaths
People from Ternopil Oblast
People from the Kingdom of Galicia and Lodomeria
Counts of Poland
Prime Ministers of Poland
Polish generals
Home Army officers
Rada Trzech
Polish Austro-Hungarians
Polish people of World War I
Austro-Hungarian military personnel of World War I
Warsaw Uprising insurgents
Polish people of the Polish–Soviet War
Olympic equestrians of Poland
Polish male equestrians
Equestrians at the 1924 Summer Olympics
Polish emigrants to the United Kingdom
Commanders of the Virtuti Militari
Grand Crosses of the Order of Polonia Restituta
Recipients of the Cross of Valour (Poland)
Recipients of the Cross of Merit with Swords (Poland)
Recipients of the Gold Cross of Merit (Poland)
Recipients of the Silver Cross of Merit (Poland)
Komorowski family
Lviv Polytechnic alumni
Polish anti-communists
Prisoners of war held at Colditz Castle
Recipients of the Order of the White Eagle (Poland)